The fifth and final season of Danmark Har Talent began airing on TV2 on 24 August 2019 and was hosted by Rasmus Brohave and Cecilie Haugaard. The judges were Signe Lindkvist, Simon Jul, Sus Wilkins and Peter Frödin. Alex Porsing won the competition against Magician Sunny Cagara who came 2nd and Joker & Harley Quinn came 3rd. This was the last season of the show, as TV2 has axed the programme.

Semi-finals
The semi finals began on 28 September 2019. Seven acts perform every week, with one act advancing from the public vote and one act advancing from the judges' vote.

Semi-final summary

Semi Finals 1

  Due to the majority vote for Miss Privileze, Peter's voting intention was not revealed.

Semi Finals 2

Semi Finals 3

  Due to the majority vote for Oscar Roth Andersen, Simon's voting intention was not revealed.

Semi Finals 4

  Due to the majority vote for Eva Sandersen, Peter's voting intention was not revealed.

Semi Finals 5

Final

References

2019 Danish television seasons
Got Talent